Ononis biflora is a species of plants in the family Fabaceae.

Sources

References 

biflora